Dictya pictipes is a species of marsh fly in the family Sciomyzidae.

References

Further reading

External links

 Diptera.info

Sciomyzidae
Diptera of North America
Insects described in 1859
Taxa named by Hermann Loew